Olearia tenuifolia, commonly known as the thin-leaf daisy-bush, is a small shrub with narrow leaves and clusters of blue, deep mauve to purple flowers.

Description
Flowering may occur anytime throughout the year and the fruit is a dry, silky achene.

Taxonomy and naming
Olearia tenuifolia was first formally described in 1867 by George Bentham and the description was published in Flora Australiensis. The specific epithet (tenuifolia) means "slender".

Distribution and habitat
Thin-leaf daisy-bush grows in New South Wales in woodland, mallee and sclerophyll forests mostly in rocky locations south of Dunedoo and west of Griffith. In Victoria it is considered rare and grows in rocky, dry locations in the Licola Creek and Valencia Creek area, and the upper Buchan River valley and Pine Mountain district.

References

Flora of New South Wales
tenuifolia
Flora of Victoria (Australia)
Plants described in 1867
Taxa named by George Bentham